List of Nigerian sportspeople includes notable sportsman of the country.

American football
 Isaiah Ekejiuba Oakland Raiders
 Samkon Gado St. Louis Rams
 Israel Idonije Chicago Bears
 Amobi Okoye Houston Texans
 Christian Okoye Kansas City Chiefs
 Jeff Otah Carolina Panthers
 Iheanyi Uwaezuoke San Francisco 49ers

Association football 
 Yakubu Guangzhou R&F
 Victor Anichebe West Brom
 Tunji Banjo
 Chibuzor Chilaka
 Christian Chukwu
 John Fashanu
 Sani Kaita
 Nwankwo Kanu played in 1994, 1998 and 2002 World Cup finals
 Garba Lawal
 Obafemi Martins VfL Wolfsburg
 Anthony Nwagbara
 Mikel John Obi Chelsea F.C.
 Segun Odegbami
 Peter Odemwingie West Bromwich Albion F.C.
 Austin "Jay-Jay" Okocha (born 1973) 
 Nedum Onuoha Manchester City F.C.
 Oguchi Onyewu
 Rashidi Yekini
 Joseph Yobo Fenerbahçe S.K.
  Michael Obafemi  Southampton
  Henry Onyekuru
  Bukayo Saka 
  Kelechi Iheanacho  Leicester City

Athletics 
 Blessing Okagbere – track and field athlete 
 Chioma Ajunwa first Nigerian Olympic gold medalist (long jump)
 Olusoji Fasuba sprinter

Basketball 
 Kenny Adeleke (born 1983) basketball player
Tunji Awojobi (born 1973) professional basketball player
 Kelenna Azubuike Golden State Warriors
 Udoka Azubuike University of Kansas
Suleiman Braimoh (born 1989) Nigerian-American basketball player in the Israel Basketball Premier League
 Yinka Dare New Jersey Nets
John Egbunu (born 1994) Nigerian-born American basketball player for Hapoel Jerusalem of the Israeli Basketball Premier League
 Obinna Ekezie (born 1975) professional basketball player
 Festus Ezeli Golden State Warriors
 Andre Iguodala Philadelphia 76ers
 Ikenna Iroegbu (born 1995), American-born Nigerian basketball player for Hapoel Galil Elyon of the Israeli Basketball Premier League
 Jayson Obazuaye (born 1984)
 Nneka Ogwumike Los Angeles Sparks
 Emeka Okafor Phoenix Suns
 Ike Ofoegbu (born 1984) American-Nigerian Israeli Premier Basketball League player
 Hakeem Olajuwon
 Victor Oladipo Orlando Magic
 Michael Olowokandi (born 1975)
 Ekpe Udoh Milwaukee Bucks
 Ime Udoka San Antonio Spurs
 Mfon Udoka Detroit Shock, Houston Comets, Los Angeles Sparks
Talib Zanna (born 1990) basketball player in the Israel Basketball Premier League

Boxing

 Dick Tiger (born Richard Ihetu) former World Boxing Association world middleweight and light-heavyweight champion.
 Hogan Bassey former World Boxing Association world featherweight champion. 
 Ike Ibeabuchi former World Boxing Council international heavyweight champion
 Samuel Peter former World Boxing Council world heavyweight champion

Mixed martial arts
 Anthony Njokuani
Israel Adesanya
Kamaru Usman
 Muhammed Lawal former Strikeforce world light-heavyweight champion

References

Nigeria
Sportspeople
List